Events in the year 2023 in Puerto Rico.

Incumbents

 President: Joe Biden (D)
 Governor: Pedro Pierluisi (D)
 Resident Commissioner: Jenniffer González

Events

Deaths

January 17 – Rickin Sánchez, television broadcaster.
January 19 – Bert Peña, baseball player (b. 1959).

See also

2023 in the United States
COVID-19 pandemic in Puerto Rico
2020s

References

 
2020s in Puerto Rico
Years of the 21st century in Puerto Rico
Puerto Rico
Puerto Rico